Harry Clark (23 April 1892 – 8 February 1973) was an Australian cricketer. He played one first-class match for Western Australia in 1922/23.

See also
 List of Western Australia first-class cricketers

References

External links
 

1892 births
1973 deaths
Australian cricketers
Western Australia cricketers
Cricketers from Sydney